Salvia taraxacifolia is a species of flowering plant in the Lamiaceae family. Very adaptable, it grows on limestone slopes, forest clearings, and rocky riversides. It has no close allies in the genus Salvia. The specific epithet, taraxacifolia, is likely Persian in origin and means 'leaves shaped like a dandelion'.

The underside is covered with hairs, giving it a whitish color. Glands on the hairs give off a pleasant citrus aroma when brushed. Plants spread into large mats, with many flower stalks blooming at once.

Notes

taraxacifolia
Flora of Morocco
Taxa named by Ernest Cosson
Taxa named by Benjamin Balansa